Fredrick "Fred" Wimbridge (9 March 1893 – 4 December 1977) was an Australian rules footballer who played in the West Australian Football League (WAFL) and with South Melbourne in the Victorian Football League (VFL).

Football
Wimbridge started his career at Perth and was their leading goal-kicker in 1915 when he kicked 36 goals.

He then spent two seasons away from the league on war service but returned to Perth in 1919. 

The following year he joined West Perth and topped their goal-kicking in 1921 with 30 goals. Despite playing as a forward that season, he made two appearances for Western Australia at the Perth Carnival as a fullback. He represented Western Australia on one further occasion.

He was already 32 when he made his way to South Melbourne, with whom he would play eight games in the 1925 VFL season. His best performance was a five-goal haul in a win over Footscray at Lake Oval.

After two years playing elsewhere in Victoria, Wimbridge returned to his original club Perth. He participated in the 1928 and 1929 seasons and then retired, having played 105 games for Perth.

Notes

References
 

1893 births
1977 deaths
Australian rules footballers from Western Australia
Australian Rules footballers: place kick exponents
Sydney Swans players
Perth Football Club players
West Perth Football Club players
Australian military personnel of World War I
Australian military personnel of World War II